Geovanny Enrique Nazareno Simisterra (born January 17, 1988) is an Ecuadorian footballer currently playing for Club 9 de Octubre.

Club career
Nazareno started with Caribe Junior. He was noticed by Barcelona and was transferred there permanently. In the 2008 season, Nazareno was loaned out to Deportivo Quito. He played in the Copa Sudamericana 2008 and the Copa Pilsener 2008 with them. However, in mid-November, Nazareno had signed two contracts with Dep. Quito and Barcelona. He was then sent to go back to Barcelona and play for them. He scored his first goal with Barcelona in a 5–0 win against LDU de Portoviejo.

International career
Giovanny has been called up to a friendly match against Mexico on November 12, 2008.

External links
 
 FEF player card
 

1988 births
Living people
People from Nueva Loja
Association football fullbacks
Ecuadorian footballers
Ecuador international footballers
2011 Copa América players
Barcelona S.C. footballers
S.D. Quito footballers
Mineros de Zacatecas players
Ecuadorian expatriate footballers
Expatriate footballers in Mexico